Leucandra  may refer to:
 Leucandra (plant), a synonym for Tragia, a flowering plant genus
 Leucandra (sponge), a calcareous sponge genus